Saint Barthélemy, officially the Collectivité territoriale de Saint-Barthélemy, also known as St. Barts (English) or St. Barth (French), is an overseas collectivity of France in the Caribbean.

Saint Barthélemy was for many years a French commune forming part of Guadeloupe, which is an overseas region and department of France. In 2003 the island voted in favour of secession from Guadeloupe to form a separate overseas collectivity (collectivité d'outre-mer, abbreviated to COM) of France. The collectivity is one of four territories among the Leeward Islands in the northeastern Caribbean that make up the French West Indies, along with Saint Martin, Guadeloupe ( southeast), and Martinique.

Its capital is Gustavia, which also contains the main harbour. It is the only Caribbean island that was a Swedish colony for any significant length of time (before the end of the Napoleonic Wars, Guadeloupe came under Swedish rule for a year before the Treaty of Paris). It remained so for nearly a century before it returned to French rule after a referendum. Symbolism from the Swedish national arms, the Three Crowns, still appears in the island's coat of arms. The language, cuisine, and culture, however, are distinctly French. The island is a popular tourist destination during the winter holiday season, geared towards the high-end, luxury tourist market.

Etymology       
The island was named by Christopher Columbus for his younger brother Bartholomew Columbus in 1493.

History

Early period 
Before European contact the island was possibly frequented by Eastern Caribbean Taíno and Arawak people, who called the island 'Ouanalao', though it is believed that the island was not inhabited permanently due to its poor water sources and soil. Christopher Columbus was the first European to encounter the island in 1493. Sporadic visits continued for the next hundred years until formal colonisation began taking shape.

17th century 
By 1648 the island was settled by the French, encouraged by Phillippe de Longvilliers de Poincy, the lieutenant-governor of the French West India Company, and initially comprised about 50 to 60 settlers, later augmented by smaller numbers coming from St Kitts. Led by Jacques Gentes, the new arrivals began cultivating cacao.  However, the settlement was attacked by Caribs in 1656 and briefly abandoned.

De Poincy was the dominant administrator in this period and a member of the Order of Saint John. He facilitated the transfer of ownership from the Compagnie des Îles de l'Amérique to the Order. He continued to rule the island until he died in 1660. Five years later, it was bought by the French West India Company along with the Order's other possessions in the Caribbean. By 1674, the company was dissolved and the islands became part of the French Kingdom and added to the colony of Guadeloupe.

18th century 

The island proved economically unsuccessful, and was subject to the activities of pirates (most notably Daniel Montbars aka 'Montbars the Exterminator'), as well as the British, who attacked the island in 1744. Thus deeming it to be of little worth, King Louis XVI traded the island to Sweden in 1784 in return for trading privileges in Gothenburg. This change of control saw progress and prosperity as the Swedes declared Gustavia (named after the Swedish king Gustav III who ruled at that time) a free port, convenient for trading by the Europeans for goods, including contraband material.

19th century 
Slavery was practised in St. Barthélemy under the Ordinance concerning the Police of Slaves and free Coloured People of 1787. The last legally owned slaves in the Swedish colony of St. Barthélemy were granted their freedom by the state on 9 October 1847. Since the island was not a plantation area, the freed slaves suffered economic hardships due to lack of opportunities for employment.

In 1852, a devastating hurricane hit the island and this was followed by a fire. The economy suffered, and thus Sweden sought to relieve themselves of the island. In 1867, a volcano “nearly destroyed the island” as recorded in the Illustrated London News.  Following a referendum in 1877, Sweden sold the island back to France in 1878, after which it was administered as part of Guadeloupe.

20th century 
On 19 March 1946, the people of the island became French citizens with full rights.
With few economic prospects on the islands, many men from St. Barthélemy took jobs on Saint Thomas to support their families. Organised tourism and hotels began in earnest in 
the 1960s and developed in the 1970s onwards, particularly after the building of the island's landing strip that can accommodate mid-sized aircraft. The island soon became renowned as a high-class luxury destination, being frequented by numerous celebrities such as Greta Garbo, Howard Hughes, Benjamin de Rothschild, David Rockefeller, Lorne Michaels, Chevy Chase, Steve Martin, Jimmy Buffett and Johnny Hallyday. The boost in tourist numbers has led to a rise in living standards and rapid modernisation.

The island was not electrified until the 1980s.

21st century 
Saint Barthélemy was for many years a French commune forming part of Guadeloupe, which is an overseas region and department of France. Through a referendum in 2003, island residents sought separation from the administrative jurisdiction of Guadeloupe, and it was finally accomplished in 2007. The island of Saint Barthélemy became an Overseas Collectivity (COM). A governing territorial council was elected for its administration, which has provided the island with a certain degree of autonomy. A senator represents the island in Paris. St. Barthélemy has retained its free port status.
Saint Barthélemy ceased being an outermost region and left the EU, to become an OCT, (Overseas Country or Territory) on 1 January 2012.

The island sustained damage from Hurricane Irma in September 2017 but recovered quickly, and by early 2018 transport and electricity were largely operational.

Geography 

St. Barthélemy is separated from Saint Martin by the Saint-Barthélemy Channel. It lies northeast of Saba and St Eustatius, and north of St Kitts. Several smaller uninhabited islands lie offshore, the largest of which are Île Fourchue, Île Coco, Île Chevreau (Île Bonhomme), Île Frégate, Île Toc Vers, Île Tortue, Roche Plate (Table à Diable) and Mancel ou la Poule et les Poussins. There are numerous smaller islets, such as La Petite Islette, L'Îlet au Vent, Île Pelé, Île le Boulanger, Roche le Bœuf, Île Petit Jean, L'Âne Rouge, Les Gros Islets, La Baleine des Gros Islets, Pain de Sucre, Les Baleines du Pain de Sucre, Fourmis, Les Petit Saints, Roches Roubes, Les Baleines de Grand Fond and Les Grenadins.

Marine areas 
St. Barthélemy forms, with St. Martin, Anguilla, and Dog Island, a distinct group that lies upon the western edge of a flat bank of soundings composed chiefly of shells, sand, and coral. From St. Barthélemy, the bank extends east-southeast, ending in a small tongue or spit. It is separated from the main bank by a narrow length of deep water.

Grande Saline Bay provides temporary anchorage for small vessels while Colombier Bay, to the northwest, has a 4 fathoms patch near mid-entrance. In the bight of St. Jean Bay, there is a narrow cut through the reef. The north and east sides of the island are fringed, to a short distance from the shore, by a visible coral reef. Reefs are mostly in shallow waters and are clearly visible. The coastal areas abound with beaches and many of these have offshore reefs, some of which are part of a marine reserve.

As the sea surrounding the St. Barthélemy is rich in coral reefs and other precious marine life, the area has been declared a protected area since 1996. Environmental awareness is quite pronounced in St. Barthélemy and is promoted by the Environmental Commission.

There are as many as 22 public beaches (most beaches on St. Barthélémy are known as "Anse de...") of which 15 are considered suitable for swimming.  They are categorized and divided into two groups, the leeward side (calm waters protected by the island itself) and the windward side (some of which are protected by hills and reefs). Windward beaches are popular for windsurfing. The beach of St Jean is suitable for water sports and facilities have been created for that purpose. The long beach at Lorient has shade and is a quiet beach as compared to St. Jean.

Grand-cul-de-sac is a long beach with facilities for water sports. Anse de Flamands is a very wide sandy beach and Le petit Anse (The little beach), just to the north of Anse de Flamands is very safe and popular with the locals for their children. Anse Toiny beach is in a remote location and is considered suitable for experienced surfers as the water current is very strong.

On the leeward side, the notable beaches are Anse du Gouverneur, Anse du Colombier which is only accessible by foot or by boat, Anse de Grand Galet (Shell Beach), and Anse de Grande Saline which is popular with nudists. The area around the salt ponds near the Anse de Grande Saline beach is marshy and is a habitat for tropical birds. Ile islet, an offshoot of the leeward side, has a white sandy beach.

Shell Beach, also called Anse de Grand Galet (in French, 'Anse' means "cove" and Galet means "pebble"), is a beach in the southwestern part of Gustavia. A large number of sea shells are scattered on this beach. This beach was subject to the strong waves of hurricane Lenny in 1999, which resulted in the erosion of the sand. This necessitated supplementing the beach with new sand in 2000.

On the north coast, on the far eastern side of the island, there are two lagoons called the Anse de Marigot and Anse du Grand Cul-de-Sac.

Interior areas 
Morne de Vitet,  in height, is the highest peak on the island. Hills and valleys of varying topography cover the rest of the island. Notable are Morne Rouge, Morne Criquet, Morne de Grand Fond, Morne de Dépoudré and Morne Lurin. The largest bodies of water on the island are Étang de Saint-Jean, Grande Saline, Grand Étang, and Petit Étang.

Populated areas 
The population is spread among 40 quartiers, roughly corresponding to settlements. They are grouped into two paroisses (parishes):

Climate 
The eastern side is wetter than the western. Although the climate is essentially arid, the rainfall does average  annually, but with considerable variation over the terrain. Summer is from May to November, which is also the rainy season. Winter from December to April is the dry season. Sunshine is very prominent for nearly the entire year and even during the rainy season. Humidity, however, is not very high due to the winds.

Demographics 
As of 2017, Saint-Barthélemy had a population of 9,961. Residents, known as Saint-Barthélemois, are French citizens. Most of them are descendants of the first settlers, of Breton, Norman, Poitevin, Saintongeais and Angevin lineage. There is also a big community of Portuguese emigrants mainly from the North of Portugal, around 3000 people. French is the native tongue of the population, though English is understood in most hotels and restaurants; a small population of Anglophones has been resident in Gustavia for many years. The St. Barthélemy French patois is spoken by some 500–700 people in the leeward portion of the island and is superficially related to Quebec French, whereas Créole French is limited to the windward side. Unlike other populations in the Caribbean, language preference between the Créole and Patois is geographically, and not racially, determined.

Historical population

Religion 

The majority of the population of Saint Barthélemy is Christian; Saint Barthélemy is considered the most religiously homogeneous territory in the French West Indies, with particular importance given to the Catholic Church.

The territory of Saint-Barthélemy forms the parish of Our Lady of the Assumption (Notre-Dame-de-l'Assomption), which in turn depends on the diocese of Basse-Terre and Pointe-à-Pitre ( diocèse de Basse-Terre et Pointe-à-Pitre) whose see is located in the cathedral of Our Lady of Guadeloupe (Notre-Dame-de-Guadeloupe).

The presbytery is located in the district of Lorient and dates from 1822. The building, including the masonry terrace, the staircases, the outbuildings and the gardens have been protected as historic monuments of France since March 28, 2002.

There are two main Catholic churches both dedicated to Our Lady of the Assumption or Notre-Dame-de-l'Assomption (the one in Lorient and the one in Gustavia) and a chapel of St. Catherine of Siena (Chapelle de Sainte Catherine de Sienne) in Colombier.

Saint Barthélemy is also part of the Diocese of the North Eastern Caribbean and Aruba (diocèse de la Caraïbe du Nord-Est et d'Aruba), which is under the Church of England (Church in the Province of the West Indies) that serves a small minority on the island that is centered in the Anglican Church of Saint Bartholomew (Église anglicane de Saint-Barthélemy) built between 1853 and 1855. The small Pentecostal Christian community does not have a church building of its own and therefore offers religious services at St Barth's Beach Hotel.

The main religious holidays are Christmas, the day of the Assumption of the Virgin Mary (August 15), All Saints' Day (November 1) and the feast of St. Bartholomew (patron saint of the island) on August 24.

Politics and government 

Until 2007 the whole island of St. Barthélemy was a French commune (commune de Saint-Barthélemy), forming part of Guadeloupe which is an overseas région and overseas département of France. In 2003, the population voted through a referendum in favour of secession from Guadeloupe to form a separate overseas collectivity (collectivité d'outre-mer, or COM) of France.

On 7 February 2007, the French Parliament passed a bill granting COM status to both St. Barthélemy and (separately) to the neighbouring Saint Martin. The new status took effect on 15 July 2007, when the first territorial council was elected, according to the law. The island has a president (elected every five years), a unicameral Territorial Council of nineteen members who are elected by popular vote and serve for five-year terms, and an executive council of seven members. Elections to these councils were first held on 1 July 2007 with the most recent election in 2017.

One senator represents the island in the Senate, while a deputy jointly elected with Saint Martin represents it in the National Assembly. St. Barthélemy became an overseas territory of the European Union on 1 January 2012, but the island's inhabitants remain French citizens with EU status holding EU passports. France is responsible for the defence of the island and as such has stationed a security force on the island comprising six policemen and thirteen gendarmes (posted on a two-year term).

The French State is represented by a Prefect appointed by the President on the advice of the Minister of the Interior. As a collectivity of France, the island's national anthem is La Marseillaise, though L'Hymne a St. Barthélemy is also used unofficially.

Economy 

The economy of the island is based on tourism and duty-free retail. The official currency of St. Barthélemy is the euro.

It is estimated that the nominal GDP of Saint Martin amounted to 367 million euros in 2014 (US$487 million at 2014 exchanges rates; US$411 million at Feb. 2022 exchange rates). In that same year the nominal GDP per capita of Saint Barthelemy was 38,994 euros (US$51,735 at 2014 exchanges rates; US$43,626 at Feb. 2022 exchange rates), which was one of the highest GDP per capita in the Caribbean, more than double the GDP per capita of the nearby Collectivity of Saint Martin, as well as 85% higher than Guadeloupe and 19% higher than metropolitan France's GDP per capita in 2014.

Tourism 
International investment and the wealth generated by tourists explain the high standard of living on the island. Most of the food is imported from the United States or France. Tourism attracts about 200,000 visitors every year. As a result, there is a boom in house-building activity catering to the tourists and also to the permanent residents of the island.

St. Barthélemy has about 25 hotels, most with 15 rooms or fewer; the largest has 58 rooms. Hotels are classified in the traditional French manner; 3 Star, 4 Star and 4 Star Luxe. Of particular note are Eden Rock and Cheval Blanc. Hotel Le Toiny, the most expensive hotel on the island, has 12 rooms.

Most places of accommodation are in the form of private villas, of which there are some 400 available to rent on the island. The island's tourism industry, though expensive, attracts 70,000 visitors every year to its hotels and villas; another 130,000 people arrive by boat. It also attracts a labour force from Portugal. A team of analysts have analysed Airbnb’s Luxe offerings in 27 of their most popular luxury locations around the world and concluded that St Barths in the Caribbean is the top location for luxury Airbnb accommodation worldwide.

Corossol is noted for its handicrafts; weaving hats and bags from palm fronds is a low-income economic activity of the indigenous people.

Wildlife

Flora 

As the terrain is generally arid, the hills have mostly poor soil and support only cacti and succulent plants. During the rainy season, the area turns green with vegetation and grass. The eastern part of the island is greener as it receives more rainfall. A 1994 survey has revealed several hundred indigenous species of plants including the naturalized varieties of flora; some grow in irrigated areas while the dry areas are dominated by the cacti variety. Sea grapes and palm trees are a common sight with mangroves and shrubs surviving in the saline coastal swamps. Coconut palm was brought to the island from the Pacific islands. Important plants noted on the island include flamboyant trees, frangipanis, sabal palms, wild trumpet and Manchineel trees.

Other trees of note include the royal palm, sea grape trees in the form of shrubs on the beaches, and as  trees in the interior areas of the island, aloe or aloe vera (brought from the Mediterranean), the night blooming cereus, mamillaria nivosa, yellow prickly pear or barbary fig which was planted as barbed wire defences against invading British army in 1773, Mexican cactus, stapelia gigantea, golden trumpet or yellow bell which was originally from South America, bougainvillea and others.

Fauna 
Marine mammals are many, such as dolphins, porpoises, and whales, are seen here during the migration period from December until May. Turtles are a common sight along the coastline of the island. They are a protected species and in the endangered list. It is stated that it will take 15–50 years for this species to attain reproductive age. Though they live in the sea, the females come to the shore to lay eggs and are protected by private societies. Three species of turtles are particularly notable.

Avifauna 

Avifauna in the wild, both native and migrating include brown pelican along the shoreline, magnificent frigatebirds with long wingspans of up to 1.8 metres (6'), green herons, snowy egrets, belted kingfishers; bananaquits; broad-winged hawks; two species of hummingbirds, the green-throated carib and Antillean crested hummingbird; and zenaida doves.

Aquafauna 

The marine life found here consists of anemones, urchins, sea cucumbers, and eels, which all live on the reefs along with turtles, conch and many varieties of marine fishes. The marine aquafauna is rich in conch, which has pearly-pink shells. Its meat is a favourite food supplement item and their shells are a collector's item. Other species of fish that are recorded close to the shoreline in shallow waters are: sergeant majors, the blue chromis, brown chromis, surgeon fish; blue tangs and trumpet fish. On the shore are ghost crabs, which always live on the beach in small burrowed tunnels made of sand, and the hermit crabs, which live on land but lay eggs in water and which also eat garbage and sewerage. They spend some months in the sea during and after the hatching season.

Marine Reserve 
Saint-Barthélemy has a marine nature reserve, known as the Reserve Naturelle that covers 1200 ha (4¾ sq.mi.), and is divided into 5 zones all around the island to form a network of protected areas. The Reserve includes the bays of Grand Cul de Sac, Colombier, Marigot, Petit Cul de Sac, and Petite Anse as well as waters around offshore rocks such as Les Gross Islets, Pain de Sucre, Tortue, and Forchue. The Reserve is designed to protect the islands' coral reefs, seagrass, and endangered marine species including sea turtles. The Reserve has two levels of protection, the yellow zones of protection where certain non-extractive activities, like snorkeling and boating, are allowed and the red zones of high protection where most activities including SCUBA are restricted to protect or recover marine life. Anchoring is prohibited in the Reserve and mooring buoys are in place in some of the protected bays like Colombier.

Landmarks and architecture 
As well as Gustavia, the capital of St. Barthélemy, there are many notable places and monuments on the island which testify to the island's colonial history under the Spanish, Swedish, British, and French, and now a French territory.

Gustavia 

Gustavia is in a U-shaped cove facing the harbour on the west. The coastal arm of this cove is in a peninsula while the dockyard is on the east side.

When the British invaded the harbour town in 1744, the town's architectural buildings were destroyed. Subsequently, new structures were built in the town around the harbour area and the Swedes had also further added to the architectural beauty of the town in 1785 with more buildings, when they had occupied the town. Earlier to their occupation, the port was known as "Carénage". The Swedes renamed it as Gustavia in honour of their king Gustav III. It was then their prime trading center. The port maintained a neutral stance since the Caribbean war was on in the 18th century. They used it as a trading post of contraband and the city of Gustavia prospered but this prosperity was short-lived.

These buildings also underwent further destruction during the hurricanes and also by gutting in 1852. However, some monuments are still intact such as the residence of the then Swedish governor, now the town hall. The oldest colonial structure in the town is stated to be the bell tower (now without a bell) built in 1799, as part of a church (destroyed in the past), in the southeast end of the town on Rue Du Presbytere. Now, a large clock is installed in place of the bell.

The road that runs parallel to the harbour face of the sea is called the Rue de la Republique and two other roads connect to the two arms of the U-shaped bay. The city has a network of roads, inherited from the Swedish period, that are laid in a grid pattern, which are either parallel or perpendicular to the three main roads that encompass the bay.

Église anglicane de Gustavia 
Église anglicane de Gustavia, the Saint-Bartholomew Anglican Church, is an important religious building in the town built in 1855 with stones brought from St Eustatius. It is on one of the town's most elegant roads, called the Rue du Centenaire. It has a bell tower. A rock wall encircles the church.

Ancien presbytère de l'église catholique de Gustavia 
Ancien presbytère de l'église catholique de Gustavia is the Catholic Church built in 1822 and is a replacement of the oldest church of the same name in Lorient. This church also has a bell tower which is separated from the main church and which rings loud and clear.

Musée Territorial de St.-Barthélemy 
Musée Territorial de St.-Barthélemy is a historical museum known as the "St. Barts Municipal Museum" also called the "Wall House" (musée – bibliothèque) in Gustavia, which is located on the far end of La Pointe. The museum is housed in an old stone house, a two-story building that has been refurbished. The island's history relating to the French, Swedish and British periods of occupation is well presented in the museum with photographs, maps, and paintings. Also on display are ancestral costumes, antique tools, models of Creole houses, and ancient fishing boats. It also houses a library.

Gustavia Lighthouse 

The  white tower of the Gustavia Lighthouse was built in 1961. It flashes every 12 seconds, white, green, or red depending on direction. The round conical tower has a single red band at the top.

Forts 
Among the notable structures in the town are the three forts built by the Swedes for defense purposes. One of these forts, known as Fort Oscar (formerly Gustav Adolph), which overlooks the sea is located on the far side of La Pointe. However, the ruins have been replaced by a modern military building which now houses the local gendarmerie. The other fort known as Fort Karl now presents very few ruins. The third fort built by the Swedes is Fort Gustav, which is also seen in ruins strewn around the weather station and the Light House. The fort built in 1787 over a hill slope has ruins of ramparts, a guardhouse, a munitions depot, a wood-burning oven, and so forth.

Savaku 
A statue, "Savaku", representing the Arawak peoples is present at Saint-Jean.

Education
 École primaire Gustavia
 École maternelle Gustavia

Private primary schools:
 École primaire privée Saint Joseph
 École primaire privée Sainte Marie

Culture

Festivals and holidays 
Some of the festivals held each year in St. Barthélemy are:

 The St. Barts Music Festival is held every January, usually during the 2nd and 3rd weeks.
 A French Carnival in February / March held for two weeks before Ash Wednesday and concluding with Ash Wednesday; on Ash Wednesday a black and white parade held at Shell Beach is the occasion of a notional burning of the image of Vaval, the Carnival King.
 St. Barth Film Festival, held annually at the end of April, was established in 1996, and hosts Caribbean films for five days.
 Armistice Day on 8 May.
 Abolition of Slavery Day on 27 May and 9 October.
 Bastille Day on 14 July.
 Victor Schoelcher Day on 21 July honouring Schoelcher, a French parliamentarian for his noble humanitarian act of abolishing slavery in French territory on 27 April 1848.
 Assumption Day on 15 August.
 Fête de Saint Barthélemy feast day of Saint Barthélemy on 24 August, in honour of the island's patron saint. Church bells are rung, boats are blessed and a regatta is held, followed by fireworks and a public ball.
 Festival of Gustavia held in August, an occasion of dragnet fishing and partying.
 All Saints Day on 1 November
 Remembrance Day (Armistice Day).
 Christmas Day on 25 December; and New Year's Eve on 31 December.

Some other festivals held are the Festival Gastronomique (April) and Yacht Festival (May). The national holidays observed are the Bastille Day and St. Barthélemy Day (day of adoption of French Constitution). Feast of St Louis is held on 1 November when thousands of candles are lit in the evening hours, which is a public holiday. All Souls Day is observed on 2 November, and it is a public holiday.

Music 
The Caribbean, the birthplace of the calypso, méringue, soca, zouk and reggae music influence the culture tremendously. The St. Barthélemy Music Festival is a major international performing arts event held every year.

Cinema 
Film director Dylan Verrechia is originally from St. Barthélemy.

Cuisine 
French cuisine, West Indian cuisine, Creole cuisine, Italian cuisine and Asian cuisine are common in St. Barthélemy. The island has over 70 restaurants serving many dishes and others are a significant number of gourmet restaurants; many of the finest restaurants are located in the hotels. There are also several snack restaurants which the French call "les snacks" or "les petits creux" which include sandwiches, pizzas, and salads. In West Indian cuisine, steamed vegetables with fresh fish is common; Creole dishes tend to be spicier. The island hosts gastronomic events throughout the year, with dishes such as spring roll of shrimp and bacon, fresh grilled lobster, Chinese noodle salad with coconut milk, and grilled beef fillet, etc.

Restaurants such as Maya's which serves Creole dishes and L'Isola which serves Italian are some of the most popular restaurants on the island. Maya's also has a "to go" store where you can take out food on the beach or just take it home. 

In the early 1990s, the island had two cooking schools:  the Saint Barts Cooking School which emphasizes classical French cuisine and Cooking in Paradise which emphasizes creole cuisine.

Fashion 
The traditional costume which is seen only among older women consists of starched white bonnets called kichnottes.

Legend 
A popular legend related to St. Barthélemy is of a seafarer hooligan looking to loot Spanish ships. French pirate Daniel Montbars, who was given the epithet "Montbars the Exterminator", took shelter in St. Barthélemy during his pirate operations and hid the loot in the sandy coves at Anse du Gouverneur.

Sports 

Rugby is a popular sport on the island. One of the major teams on the island is "Les Barracudas," named after the ferocious fish of the Caribbean. They often play teams from Anguilla and other surrounding islands.

Gustavia is also known as a haven for yachting, with many events being held there each year. These include the St Barths Bucket Regatta, the Saint Barth's Cup and Les Voiles de St. Barth in April, and the International Regatta in May. Deep sea fishing is also undertaken from the waterfront of Lorient, Flamands, and Corossol to fish for tuna, marlin, bonito, barracuda and wahoo. St Barth Open Fishing tournament is held in July.

The Transat AG2R Race, held every alternate year, is an event that originates in Concarneau in Brittany, France, reaching St. Barthélemy. It is a boat race with boats of  length with a single hull and with essential safety equipment. Each boat is navigated by two sailors. Kitesurfing and other water sports have also become popular on the island in recent years, especially at Grand Cul-de-Sac beach (Baie de Grand Cul de Sac) for windy sports as kitesurfing and Saint Jean Beach ( Baie de Saint Jean), Lorient, Toiny and Anse des Cayes for surfing. Tennis is also popular on the island and it has several tennis clubs, Tennis Clube de Flamboyant in Grand Cul-de-Sac, AJOE Tennis Club in Orient, and ASCO in Colombier.

The Swedish Marathon Race, also called the Gustavialoppet, is held in December.

Transport 

St. Barthélemy has a small airport Gustaf III Airport with a runway length of 646 meter/2,119 ft. Airport codes: SBH (IATA), TFFJ (ICAO). The airport is served by small regional commercial aircraft and charters of up to 19 passengers, as well as helicopters. Passengers for destination St. Barth arrive on international commercial airlines jet airliners and large private jets mainly via the neighboring island Sint Maarten's Princess Juliana International Airport, which is a hub to connect with the regional carriers. Several international airlines and regional Caribbean airlines operate from this hub.

St. Barth has its own airline, St. Barth Commuter which in addition to the scheduled and charter flight services, provides medical transport services.

Many inter-island ferry services operate regularly between St. Martin and St. Barts. There are three ferry services active at the moment, one is operated by Voyager (which leaves from Marigot) one day-trip ferry by the Edge (Leaving from Simpsons Bay) and one regular ferry service by the Great Bay Ferry from Philipsburg. 

The narrow and congested roads, and difficulty in parking, have been an impetus for driving Smart cars.

Media 
A weekly journal entitled Journal de St. Barth is published in the French language. Its English-language abridged version, St. Barth Weekly, is published only during the winter (for Anglophone tourists). Reflecting the island's popularity with the rich and famous, the high-fashion magazine L'Officiel publishes a seasonal local edition. Other tourist-related information is available at the airport and in the offices of the Tourist Authority.

There are two local TV broadcasters and five FM radio channels (2021). The island has a fully integrated access telephone system with capability for the direct dialing on fixed and wireless systems. There is a 4G/LTE mobile service since 2019.

Health facilities 
The island has a small hospital, the Hôpital de Bruyn, in Gustavia with an adjacent diagnostic laboratory. There is also at least one private diagnostic facility. Specialists in cardiology, general medicine, dentists, ENT, OB/GYN, paediatrics and rheumatology are also available. There are many pharmacies dispensing medicines. For more advanced facilities, patients go to Guadeloupe, United States, San Juan or France.

Notable people 
 Eugénie Blanchard was the world's oldest living person (114 years, 261 days) at the time of her death on 4 November 2010. She was born on St. Barthélemy and spent most of her life on Curaçao and St. Barthélemy as a Catholic nun.
 Johnny Hallyday chose to be buried on St. Barthélemy in the Église de Lorient parish cemetery.

See also 

 Outline of Saint Barthélemy
 Index of Saint Barthélemy-related articles

Notes

References

External links 

 Mémoire St Barth

 Government
 Collectivity of Saint Barthélemy (official government website) 
  Comité Territorial du Tourisme (tourism board website) 

 Historical and botanical information
 Mémoire St Barth: Saint-Barthelemy's history (slave trade, slavery, abolitions)
 Histoire et aménagement linguistique à Saint-Barthélemy 
 Saint Barth Fauna & Flora

 General information
 Saint Barthelemy. The World Factbook. Central Intelligence Agency.
 A comprehensive visitor's guide

 
1648 establishments in North America
1648 establishments in the French colonial empire
1784 disestablishments in the French colonial empire
1784 establishments in North America
1784 establishments in the Swedish colonial empire
1878 establishments in Guadeloupe
1878 establishments in North America
2003 disestablishments in Guadeloupe
2007 establishments in France
2007 establishments in North America
Dependent territories in the Caribbean
Island countries
Former colonies in North America
Former dependencies of Guadeloupe
Former French colonies
Former Swedish colonies
French Caribbean
French colonization of the Americas
French Union
French-speaking countries and territories
Islands of France
Leeward Islands (Caribbean)
Overseas collectivities of France
Purchased territories
States and territories disestablished in 2003
States and territories established in 1648